Surviving Compton: Dre, Suge & Michel'le is a 2016 American biographical television drama film directed by Jackie Cooke, starring Rhyon Nicole Brown as Michel'le, Curtis Hamilton as Dr. Dre and Jamie Kennedy as N.W.A's manager Jerry Heller. The film is based on the true story of R&B singer Michel'le. The omission of Michel'le's involvement in the lives of Dre in N.W.A's 2015 biopic, Straight Outta Compton, gave her an opportunity to tell her story as a former artist on Eazy-E's Ruthless Records.

The film premiered on Lifetime on October 15, 2016.

Plot
Discovered at a young age, the shy, squeaky-voiced Michel'le (Brown) was plucked straight from South Central, Los Angeles and catapulted into the spotlight while riding N.W.A’s rocket ride of early success. Surrounded by industry visionaries from Eazy-E to Tupac Shakur, Michel’le quickly climbed the charts; but, her musical successes were soon overshadowed by betrayal and corruption. A nearly decade-long abusive relationship with the infamous Dr. Dre (Hamilton) pushed her into a life tarnished by alcohol, drugs and violence until her savior came in the unlikely form of Suge Knight (Taylor), co-founder of Death Row Records and Dre's business partner. Friendship would turn into a courtly romance, but the union Michel'le thought they had did not end happily-ever-after. With children from both men and a career to protect, Michel’le's voice became silenced by Compton’s biggest power players. Until now. She was determined to find her voice again.

Cast
 Rhyon Nicole Brown as Michel'le
 Jamie Kennedy as Jerry Heller
 Curtis Hamilton as Dr. Dre
 Vonii Bristow as Ice Cube
 Omari Wallace as Eazy-E
 Daniel DeBoe as M.C. Ren
 Deric Augustine as DJ Yella
 Kedrick Brown as Alonzo Williams
 R. Marcos Taylor as Suge Knight
 Adrian Arthur as Tupac Shakur
 Michel'le as Herself (Narrator)

Reception 
Prior to the release of the film, Dr Dre's lawyers threatened legal action against the filmmakers if the movie contained scenes of him assaulting her, which he denied. However, the film portrays Dre physically abusing Michel'le, even shooting at her in one scene. Dre ultimately did not take any legal actions for his depiction.

Reviews 
Reviewing the film, Ben Westhoff at The Guardian wrote:The question many viewers will have after their viewing: is the film accurate? I would say, for the most part, yes. I extensively interviewed Michel’le and other survivors of Dre’s alleged abuse for my new book Original Gangstas: the Untold Story of Dr Dre, Eazy-E, Ice Cube, Tupac Shakur, and the Birth of West Coast Rap, and investigated their claims. The film largely echoes Michel'le’s accounts to me, though she never went to police with her allegations – unlike other women including television host Dee Barnes and Lisa Johnson, the mother of three of Dre's children who alleged he beat her many times, including while she was pregnant. (Dre pled no contest to beating Barnes, and received probation, while Johnson was granted a restraining order against him. A Ruthless rapper named Tairrie B also maintains that Dre beat her.)

Awards and nominations 
Surviving Compton: Dre, Suge & Michel'le was nominated for Writers Guild of America Award for Television: Long Form – Original at the 69th Writers Guild of America Awards in 2016.

References

External links
 Surviving Compton: Dre, Suge & Michel'le on Lifetime

2016 television films
2016 films
2016 biographical drama films
Hood films
Lifetime (TV network) films
African-American films
African-American biographical dramas
Biographical films about singers
2010s American films